Stadion FC Solothurn is a football stadium in Solothurn, Switzerland. It is the home ground of FC Solothurn and has a capacity of 6,750.

References
FC Solothurn, Soccerway

Football venues in Switzerland
Solothurn
Buildings and structures in the canton of Solothurn